Cecidothyris orbiferalis is a species of moth of the family Thyrididae. It is found in the small African country of Togo.

The wings of this species are reddish brown with numerous small and big spots. Its wingspan is 23–26 mm.

References

Thyrididae
Moths described in 1917
Moths of Africa
Fauna of Togo